Microbacterium dextranolyticum is a bacterium of the family Microbacteriaceae.

References

Further reading

External links

LPSN
Type strain of Microbacterium dextranolyticum at BacDive -  the Bacterial Diversity Metadatabase

dextranolyticum
Bacteria described in 1993